Lutverci is a village on the right bank of the Mura River in the Apače in northeastern Slovenia.

References

External links 
Lutverci on Geopedia

Populated places in the Municipality of Apače